Alsterdorf is a metro station on the Hamburg U-Bahn line U1. The station was opened in December 1914 and is located in the Hamburg district of Alsterdorf, Germany. Alsterdorf is part of the borough of Hamburg-Nord.

Location 
The station is located on the southern edge of the eponymous district of Alsterdorf, right on the border with Winterhude. For several years now, the Hamburg police headquarters have been in the immediate vicinity. The track of the Hamburg freight bypass is located on the same embankment south of the subway tracks.

Structure and history 
Alsterdorf has a central platform suitable for 120-meter-long trains on the embankment. The only access is at the northeast end and has a fixed and an escalator. Since there is no elevator, the platform is not barrier-free.

The stop was opened as early as 1914 as part of the former elevated railway branch line Ohlsdorf - Kellinghusenstraße, which later became part of today's U1. The access building was last extensively modernized at the end of the 1990s. The originally existing building was demolished as part of the modernization measures.

Service

Trains 
Alsterdorf is served by Hamburg U-Bahn line U1; departures are every 5 minutes. Bus lines 19, 23, 26, 118, 179 and night bus line 606 have a stop in front of the station.

See also 

 List of Hamburg U-Bahn stations

References

External links 

 Line and route network plans at hvv.de 

Hamburg U-Bahn stations in Hamburg
U1 (Hamburg U-Bahn) stations
Buildings and structures in Hamburg-Nord
Railway stations in Germany opened in 1914